Eliot Glassheim (February 10, 1938 – December 25, 2019)  was a North Dakota Democratic-NPL Party member of the North Dakota House of Representatives, representing the 18th district from 1993 until 2017. He served as a Representative previously in 1975. Glassheim served on the Grand Forks City Council from 1982 to 2012. He obtained B.A. from Wesleyan University and a M.A. and Ph.D. from the University of New Mexico. Glassheim founded Dr. Eliot's Twice Sold Tales, a used bookstore, which he owned until January 2015. Glassheim also wrote several books and poems.

Glassheim was the Democratic-NPL nominee for the 2016 U.S. Senate election. He lost to incumbent Republican Sen. John Hoeven by nearly 62 percentage points. He died December 25, 2019 from lung cancer.

Personal
Glassheim was Jewish.

References

External links
North Dakota Legislative Assembly - Representative Eliot Glassheim official ND Senate website
Project Vote Smart - Representative Eliot Glassheim (ND) profile
Follow the Money - Eliot Glassheim
2006 2004 2000 1998 campaign contributions
North Dakota Democratic-NPL Party - Representative Eliot Glassheim profile

1938 births
2019 deaths
20th-century American businesspeople
21st-century American Jews
21st-century American politicians
Businesspeople from North Dakota
Candidates in the 2016 United States Senate elections
Deaths from cancer in North Dakota
Deaths from lung cancer
Jewish American people in North Dakota politics
Politicians from Grand Forks, North Dakota
Politicians from New York City
University of New Mexico alumni
Wesleyan University alumni
Writers from New York City
Writers from North Dakota
Democratic Party members of the North Dakota House of Representatives